Benito Juárez is a village in the  Mexican state of Veracruz. Located in the state's Huasteca Baja region, it serves as the municipal seat for the surrounding municipality of the same name.

In the 2005 INEGI Census, Benito Juárez reported a total population of 1,069.

Prior to 1932, Benito Juárez was known as Santa Cruz de Juárez.

See also
Benito Juárez, 19th century statesman after whom these places are named.

References

External links 

  Municipal Official Site
  Municipal Official Information

Populated places in Veracruz